Carol Cheng Yu Ling (Traditional Chinese: 鄭裕玲; born 9 September 1957), is a Hong Kong film/television actress and host. Arguably one of the most famous celebrities to have emerged during the British colonial period, Cheng made her break in TVB Cantonese TV series, Man in the Net. In the 1980s, she was commonly referred to by her nickname Do Do. She is one of the richest TV actresses in Hong Kong who turned her career to films. Cheng is regarded as a "living Hong Kong Cinema legend" who has brought to fame previous unknowns such as Jackie Chan, Jackie Cheung and Andy Lau. She also has won numerous acting awards in both film and television genres, as well as hosting awards. In October 2022, Cheng announced she would not be renewing her contract with TVB after 44 years with the company.

Biography 
Cheng was born in Hong Kong. She is of Sichuanese heritage and her native language is Northern Mandarin. Cheng's family taught her Cantonese at a young age, in which she is equally fluent as a native speaker. Cheng began her career with Commercial Television Limited after secondary school in 1975. After the collapse of the TV station in 1978, she moved to Television Broadcasts Limited and has been a superstar at the channel since. She starred in various drama series. She also hosted shows like Miss Hong Kong Beauty Pageant and the Hong Kong version of the game show The Weakest Link between 2001–2002.

In 1984, Cheng won the 3rd Hong Kong Film Awards Best New Performer. In 1988 and 1991, Cheng won the Hong Kong Film Awards for Best Actress. In 2000, Cheng won the TVB Anniversary Awards: My Favourite TV Role and Best Actress.

In recent years, Cheng retired from acting but is still involved in hosting.  She is frequently the host of TVB Awards Presentation.

Cheng is also a radio host who has interviewed celebrities and music bands such as Jackson Wang, Mirror and much more. Cheng is also frequently associated with FAMA, another famous hip hop duo. The trio have been on multiple entertainment media forms, such as interacting with local celebrities in variety shows and travel reality television shows have since surged in the last decade. Due to their humor presented on screen, Cheng and FAMA have resonated greatly with Hong Kong audiences alike.

Selected filmography 
 Frugal Game (2002)
 War of the Genders [TVB series] (2000)
 My Rice Noodle Shop (1998)
 Her Fatal Ways 4 (1994)
 It's a Wonderful Life (1994)
 Holy Weapon (1993)
 Murder (1993)
 Once Upon a Time a Hero in China II (1993)
 Her Fatal Ways 3 (1993)
 She Starts the Fire (1992)
 Heart Against Hearts (1992)
 Now You See Love... Now You Don't (1992)
 Neverending Summer (1992)
 Second to None (1992)
 Once a Black Sheep (1992)
 The Banquet (1991)
 Her Fatal Ways 2 (1991)
 Armour of God II: Operation Condor (1991)
 Her Fatal Ways (1991)
 Queen of Gamble (1991)
 Slickers vs. Killers (1991)
 The Top Bet (1991)
 To Catch a Thief (1991)
 BB 30 (1990)
 Tiger Cage 2 (1990)
 Promising Miss Bowie (1990)
 Brief Encounter in Shinjuku (1990)
 Heart into Hearts (1990)
 Perfect Match (1989)
 The Yuppie Fantasia (1989)
 The Nobles (1989)
 Doubles Cause Troubles (1989)
 Tiger Cage (1988)
 The Eighth Happiness (1988)
 The Crazy Companies II (1988)
 Women Prison (1988)
 Sister Cupid (1987)
 The Return of the Condor Heroes (1976)

Music Video 
 Denis Kwok - "越州公路 193 (Cross-Continent Road 193)" (2022)

Variety show hosting 
 Beautiful Cooking (2006)
 Do Do Goes Shopping (2015–2017)
 Do Did Eat (2016, 2018, 2019)
 Miss Hong Kong Pageant

Awards and nominations 
Cheng has been the recipient of several awards and nominations from the Hong Kong Film Awards:

References 

1957 births
Living people
20th-century Hong Kong actresses
21st-century Hong Kong actresses
Hong Kong Buddhists
Hong Kong film actresses
Hong Kong television actresses
Hong Kong women television presenters
TVB actors
Hong Kong women comedians